Corematosetia is a genus of moths in the family Sesiidae.

Species
Corematosetia minuta  Kallies & Arita, 2006
Corematosetia naumanni  Kallies & Arita, 2001

References

Sesiidae